Chris Hanson (born 12 December 1990 in New York) is an American professional squash player. As of July 2018, he was ranked number 60 in the world.

References

1990 births
Living people
American male squash players
Dartmouth Big Green men's squash players
Squash players at the 2019 Pan American Games
Pan American Games medalists in squash
Pan American Games gold medalists for the United States
Medalists at the 2019 Pan American Games